Onoshi no Tamori (小野氏淡理) was a Japanese noble and waka poet in the Nara period.

Biography 
The details of the life of Onoshi no Tamori are unknown. He was likely a member of the Ono clan. In Tenpyō 2 (730) he participated in a plum blossom-viewing party at the residence of Ōtomo no Tabito, then the governor (一大宰帥 ichi Dazai no sochi) of the Dazaifu.

Yūkichi Takeda's Man'yōshū Zenchūshaku (万葉集全註釈) speculates that he may have been the same person as the  who served as ambassador (ja) to Parhae.

Poetry 
Poem 846 in the Man'yōshū is attributed to him.

See also 
 Reiwa

References

Citations

Works cited 

 
 

8th-century Japanese poets
Man'yō poets
Japanese male poets
Ono clan